Rhipidognathidae is a family of multielement conodonts from the Ordovician.

Genera
Genera are:
 †Appalachignathus Bergström et al., 1974
 †Bergstroemognathus Spergali, 1974
 †Rhipidognathus Branson, Mehl and Branson, 1951

References

External links 

Prioniodontida
Conodont families
Ordovician conodonts
Ordovician first appearances
Ordovician extinctions